The Insula Lake State Forest is a state forest located in Lake County, Minnesota. The forest is entirely within the limits of the Boundary Waters Canoe Area Wilderness of the Superior National Forest, and as such falls under the jurisdiction and management of the United States Forest Service.

In addition to canoeing, popular outdoor recreational activities include hunting and fishing.

See also
List of Minnesota state forests

External links
Insula Lake State Forest - Minnesota Department of Natural Resources (DNR)

References

Minnesota state forests
Protected areas of Lake County, Minnesota
Protected areas established in 1963